Edvard Mikaelian (born 25 May 1950 in Yerevan, Armenian SSR) is a former Soviet Armenian artistic gymnast. He was awarded the Master of Sport of the USSR, International Class title in 1972.

Mikaelian started gymnastics in 1960 under the direction of the honored coach of the Armenian SSR, Leonid Zakharyan. He was a member of the USSR national gymnastics team from 1967-1974. During that time, Mikaelian competed at the 1972 Summer Olympics in Munich. He participated in every artistic gymnastic event and was a member of the silver medal winning team in the Team All-Around. He also competed at the 1974 World Artistic Gymnastics Championships in Varna, where the Soviet team once again won a silver medal. In 1976, he completed his career.

Mikaelian later engaged in coaching. From 1993-1994, he was the head coach of the Armenian national gymnastics team.

Personal life
Edvard's younger brother, Ruben, was also a gymnast who became a USSR Champion on the pommel horse in 1975.

References

External links
 Sports-Reference.com

1950 births
Living people
Sportspeople from Yerevan
Soviet male artistic gymnasts
Armenian male artistic gymnasts
Olympic gymnasts of the Soviet Union
Gymnasts at the 1972 Summer Olympics
Olympic silver medalists for the Soviet Union
Olympic medalists in gymnastics
Soviet Armenians
Medalists at the 1972 Summer Olympics
Medalists at the World Artistic Gymnastics Championships